Naranjos Amatlán is a municipality in Veracruz, Mexico. It is located in north zone of the State of Veracruz, about 402 km from state capital Xalapa. The municipal seat is Naranjos.

The municipality of Naranjos Amatlán is delimited to the north by Chinampa de Gorostiza to the east and south-east by Tamiahua, to the south and south-west by Tancoco and to the west by Tamalín.

It produces principally maize, beans, orange fruit, coffee and mango.

In Naranjos Amatlán, in March takes place the celebration in honor to San José de la Montaña, patron of the town.

The weather in Naranjos Amatlán is warm all year with rains in summer and autumn.

Climate
It has a hot-humid-tropical climate, most of the year is hot (from May to October) winter is usually between warm and cool.
The heat is really common, including some days in the winter.
When spring is finishing (May–June) is usually very hot and dry, while in the summer is a little bit less but much rainier, fall's beginning October) is still hot, the rest is cooler, cold fronts start that are from Mexico's Gulf.
  
°F (°C)

January Max. 73 (23) Min. 57 (14)

February Max. 75 (24) Min. 61 (16)

March Max. 81 (27) Min. 63 (17)

April Max. 84 (29) Min. 66 (19)

May  Max. 90 (32)  Min. 72 (22)

June  Max. 95 (35) Min. 73 (23)

July Max. 88 (31) Min. 72 (22)

August Max. 91 (33)  Min. 73 (23)

September Max. 90 (32)  Min. 70 (21)

October Max. 88 (31)  Min. 68 (20)

November Max. 79 (26)  Min. 61 (16)

December Max. 75 (24) Min. 59 (15)

References

External links 

  Municipal Official webpage
  Municipal Official Information

Municipalities of Veracruz